Daniel James (born 21 July 1975) is an Australian record producer and songwriter. His genres include pop, dance, electropop, as well as pop rock.

Life and career

Early life
James was born in Sydney, but grew up briefly in New Zealand until the age of five, when he relocated back to Sydney. Around age 12 he began singing and performing in church, which inspired him to begin a career in music. He started writing songs at the age of 17 and became involved with various touring bands, as well as his solo project Eden. Eden received airplay on 2Day FM, Sydney's top pop station as part of a song competition.

Career 
In 2002 James and wife Leah Haywood met and began writing together on a duet electronic project "Dreamlab"; they went on to write "Top of the World" performed by Mandy Moore featured on the Stuart Little 2 soundtrack. They continued producing and writing together creating the production company under their most recent artist endeavour, Dreamlab. In 2004 James alongside Haywood co-wrote and co-produced Aly and AJ's debut top 40 single "Rush" and produced 8 tracks on the record; which has sold in excess of a million records worldwide. James also co-wrote half the tracks and produced the entire record The Moon Under Water for Ryan Cabrera.

With his initial mainstream success James went on to produce and write "Promise", "Drive", and "Afriad" off Vanessa Hudgens album V. In 2009 he produced and co-wrote the hit single "Supergirl" for Miley Cyrus off the album Hannah Montana 3, which debuted at number five on Billboard's Bubbling Under Hot 100 Singles Chart. During this time period he also produced and wrote "Masquerade" for Ashley Tisdale off her album Guilty Pleasure. James later went on to produce and co-write 3 tracks off Demi Lovato's album Unbroken as well as "Hit the Lights" for Selena Gomez which is her next single off the album When the Sun Goes Down. From then he has worked with Grammy Award nominated artist Nicki Minaj, co-producing and co-writing the track "Marilyn Monroe". After his continued success, Dreamlab set up the imprint Layer Cake Records with their first signings of Neon Hymns and Hunter Parrish.

Discography

References 

1975 births
Living people
Australian record producers
Australian songwriters
Musicians from Sydney